Time of the Last Persecution is the second studio album by English singer-songwriter Bill Fay, released in 1971 by Deram Records. The album was influenced by the Biblical books of Daniel and Revelation. The album was re-released in 2005 with bonus tracks.

Track listing
"Omega Day" – 3:14
"Don't Let My Marigolds Die" – 2:26
"I Hear You Calling" – 2:57
"Dust Filled Room" – 2:03
"'Til the Christ Come Back" – 3:08
"Release Is in the Eye" – 2:41
"Laughing Man" – 3:15
"Inside the Keepers Pantry" – 2:29
"Tell It Like It Is" – 2:32
"Plan D" – 3:12
"Pictures of Adolf Again" – 2:27
"Time of the Last Persecution" – 3:54
"Come a Day" – 2:27
"Let All the Other Teddies Know" – 2:31

Personnel
Bill Fay - Vocals, piano 
Ray Russell - Guitar
Alan Rushton - Drums
Darryl Runswick - Bass
Nick Evans - Trombone

References

1971 albums
Deram Records albums
Bill Fay albums